Scrobipalpula polemoniella is a moth in the family Gelechiidae. It was described by Annette Frances Braun in 1925. It is found in North America, where it has been recorded from Ohio.

The larvae feed on Polemonium reptans.

References

Scrobipalpula
Moths described in 1925